Soft tennis was a discipline of the tennis competitions at the 2002 Asian Games. Competition took place from October 1 to October 7. All events were held at Sajik Tennis Courts. The host nation South Korea dominated the competition by winning all seven gold medals.

Schedule

Medalists

Medal table

Participating nations
A total of 54 athletes from 7 nations competed in soft tennis at the 2002 Asian Games:

References

 www.soft-tennis.org

External links 
2002 Asian Games Report, Pages 690–701

 
2002 Asian Games events
2002
Asian Games
2002 Asian Games